Celestine Mbarassem is a Chadian footballer who last played for Berekum Chelsea of the Ghanaian Premier League.

Berekum Chelsea
One of 19 new acquisitions for Berekum Chelsea ahead of the 2011–12 Ghanaian Premier League, he vowed to be a top scorer for the club.

References

External links

Association football forwards
1989 births
Chadian footballers
Living people
Ghana Premier League players
Berekum Chelsea F.C. players
Expatriate footballers in Ghana
Place of birth missing (living people)